David Park (born 25 June 1974) is a Welsh professional golfer.

Park was born in London to Welsh parents and represents Wales. In 1997, he won the 1997 Brabazon Trophy and was a member of the Great Britain & Ireland Walker Cup team before turning professional late in the year.

Park was a rookie on the European Tour in 1999, and made a flying start to his tour career. His first event was the Moroccan Open, where he led from the beginning, before losing a playoff to Miguel Ángel Martín at the sixth sudden-death hole. His second event was the Compaq European Grand Prix, and he won it. However, he has not lived up to this early promise, and through 2008 he has not bettered his rookie season Order of Merit ranking of 40th.

Amateur wins
1997 Brabazon Trophy

Professional wins (3)

European Tour wins (1)

European Tour playoff record (0–1)

Challenge Tour wins (2)

Results in major championships

Note: Park only played in The Open Championship.

CUT = missed the half-way cut

Team appearances
Amateur
Jacques Léglise Trophy (representing Great Britain & Ireland): 1992 (winners)
European Amateur Team Championship (representing Wales): 1995, 1997
Walker Cup (representing Great Britain & Ireland): 1997

Professional
World Cup (representing Wales): 1999
Alfred Dunhill Cup (representing Wales): 2000

External links

Welsh male golfers
European Tour golfers
Augusta Jaguars men's golfers
1974 births
Living people